Chris Blake is a Welsh international lawn and indoor bowler.

Bowls career
He won a silver medal in the fours at the 1996 World Outdoor Bowls Championship in Adelaide.

He won the 1994 triples title and 2001 pairs title at the Welsh National Bowls Championships when bowling for Cardiff Bowls Club. He subsequently became a British champion after winning the 1995 triples title at the British Isles Bowls Championships.

References

Welsh male bowls players
Living people
1971 births